Sarchah-e Varaun (also Romanized as Sarchāh-e Varā‘ūn; also known as Chāh-e Varā‘ūn, Varārān, Varā‘ūn, and Vār‘ūn) is a village in Aqda Rural District, Aqda District, Ardakan County, Yazd Province, Iran. At the 2006 census, its population was 23, in 8 families.

References 

Populated places in Ardakan County